Paranginsky District (Poranča kundem) is an administrative and municipal district (raion), one of the fourteen in the Mari El Republic, Russia. It is located in the east of the republic. Its administrative center is the urban locality (an urban-type settlement) of Paranga. As of the 2010 Census, the total population of the district was 16,307, with the population of Paranga accounting for 36.7% of that number.

Administrative and municipal status
Within the framework of administrative divisions, Paranginsky District is one of the fourteen in the republic. It is divided into one urban-type settlement (an administrative division with the administrative center in the urban-type settlement (inhabited locality) of Paranga) and eight rural okrugs, all of which comprise forty-eight rural localities. As a municipal division, the district is incorporated as Paranginsky Municipal District. Paranga Urban-Type Settlement is incorporated into an urban settlement, and the eight rural okrugs are incorporated into eight rural settlements within the municipal district. The urban-type settlement of Paranga serves as the administrative center of both the administrative and municipal district.

References

Notes

Sources

Districts of Mari El
